Santa Cruz de Chinina is a corregimiento in Chepo District, Panamá Province, Panama with a population of 1,572 as of 2010. Its population as of 1990 was 1,954; its population as of 2000 was 1,715.

References

Corregimientos of Panamá Province